Masood Kausar is a Pakistani politician who was 28th Governor of Khyber Pakhtunkhwa. He held many senior government positions including; Speaker of the Assembly, Minister for Communications, Deputy Leader of Opposition in Khyber Pakhtunkhwa province and Chairman of standing committee while he was Member of the Senate of Pakistan. He is one of the founding members of the Pakistan Peoples Party (PPP).

Political career 

Returning from United Kingdom in the 1970s, Barrister Masood Kausar joined (PPP). He held various positions in the party and eventually succeeded Aftab Ahmad Khan Sherpao to become the Provincial President of PPP in Khyber Pakhtunkhwa. Under Masood Kausar, the PPP grow from strength to strength and became very effective in the province. He initiated and oversaw party reorganisation in all towns and districts.

Barrister Masood Kausar served as Speaker of the provincial assembly of Khyber-Pakhtunkhwa from 1988 to 1990. After getting re-elected in 1990, he was elected Deputy Leader of Opposition from 1990 to 1993. In 1994 he was elected as a member of the Senate of Pakistan in 1994 for six years term.

A close associate of Benazir Bhutto, Asif Ali Zardari, Bilawal Bhutto and member of PPP "Think Tank" committee and Central Executive Committee.

Professional career 

Masood Kausar has appeared before the High Courts and the Supreme Court of Pakistan in various cases. He was elected President of the Peshawar High Court Bar Association in 1984 and has also been an honorary visiting Professor of law at the University Law College Peshawar.

Education 

Masood Kausar earned his Bachelor of Arts from Islamia College, Peshawar. After completing his degree, he opted for education in law and jurisprudence and got his LLB degree from the Peshawar University in 1960. He was called to the Bar in 1968 from the Honorable Society of Lincoln's Inn, England.

Kausar took keen interest in the extra-curricular activities at all the educational institutions he attended and was very popular among students and his colleagues. He has a rare distinction to his credit for having been elected as President of the Khyber Union of Islamia College Peshawar. He was the first elected General Secretary of the Peshawar University Students Union. During his stay in England, Masood Kausar was again elected as the General Secretary of the Pakistan Students' Federation Great Britain.

Family 

Masood Kausar is married with three sons. He is the brother of Urdu poet Ahmad Faraz. His nephew Shibli Faraz is house leader in the Senate of Pakistan.

Sources 
http://thepost.com.pk/Ba_ShortNews.aspx?fbshortid=2843&bcatid=14&bstatus=Current&fcatid=14&fstatus=Current
https://web.archive.org/web/20071209095132/http://www.senate.gov.pk/ShowMemberDetail.asp?MemberCode=470&CatCode=0&CatName=
https://web.archive.org/web/20071219220238/http://www.pap.gov.pk/pro-ass/nwfp.htm
https://web.archive.org/web/20060927155932/http://www.khyber.org/people/pol/AftabAhmadKhanSherpao.shtml
http://www.lib.virginia.edu/area-studies/SouthAsia/SAserials/Dawn/1998/14Feb98.html
http://www.khyberpakhtunkhwa.gov.pk/

References

Hindkowan people
Living people
Governors of Khyber Pakhtunkhwa
University of Peshawar alumni
Year of birth missing (living people)